Javaka Steptoe (born April 19, 1971) is an American author and illustrator. He won the 2017 Caldecott Medal as well as the Americas Award for Children's and Young Adult Literature, and the Coretta Scott King Book Award from the American Library Association for his picture book Radiant Child: The Story of Young Artist Jean-Michel Basquiat.

Early life 
Javaka Steptoe was born and raised in Brooklyn, New York. He is the son of John Steptoe, who twice won Caldecott Honors (for his book The Story of Jumping Mouse in 1985 and Mufaro’s Beautiful Daughters in 1988.) Growing up, Javaka Steptoe served as a model for his father's books. He then attended Cooper Union, earning a BFA.

Career 
Steptoe's Radiant Child: The Story of Young Artist Jean-Michel Basquiat was initially inspired by an exhibit he saw of American artist Jean-Michel Basquiat's artwork at the Brooklyn Museum in 2005. The resulting picture book won the 2017 Caldecott Medal as well as the Americas Award for Children's and Young Adult Literature and the Coretta Scott King Book Award from the American Library Association.

Steptoe's other works include illustrating Jimi Sounds Like a Rainbow: A Story of the Young Jimi Hendrix (Clarion Books, 2010) and writing and illustrating In Daddy’s Arms I Am Tall: African Americans Celebrating Fathers (Lee & Low Books, 1997), which also won the Coretta Scott King Book Award.

Personal life 
Steptoe lives in Brooklyn.

References

External links
 Official website

1971 births
Living people
American children's book illustrators
Artists from Brooklyn
Caldecott Medal winners
Cooper Union alumni
Writers from Brooklyn